

Tracy Harris (born 1958) is an American artist, known for her abstract, encaustic paintings. Tracy Harris lives in Milford, Pennsylvania.

Biography 
Tracy Harris was born in 1958 in Lawton, Oklahoma, and she grew up in Dallas, Texas until age 10. Her parents are Janene Harris and architect, Hayes Harris. After age 10, the family moved a lot after her father took a civilian architect role with the United States Army and Air Force, they lived in Honolulu, Guam, Manila, and Thailand.

She attended Southern Methodist University, receiving a BFA degree and MFA degree in 1983. After college she worked at the Dallas Museum of Art and taught painting classes.

It was through her work at the Dallas museum she was connected by a mutual friend to minimalist artist Dan Flavin, initially as a penpal and later as long distance dating. She married Dan Flavin in 1992 at the Solomon R. Guggenheim Museum. Harris later lived between Long Island, New York and Greenwich, Connecticut after the marriage. Four years after marriage, Flavin died from complications from his diabetes.

Her artwork is in a number of museum collections including Museum of Fine Arts, Houston, Telfair Museum, Savannah, the Amarillo Museum of Art, among others.

References

Further reading
Ennis, Michael. "Beneath the Surface". Texas Monthly (Mar 1990): 12. Abstract: "Michael Ennis reviews an exhibition featuring the paintings of Tracy Harris at the W. A. Graham Gallery from Mar 9 through Apr 17, 1990 in Houston."
Chadwick, Susan. "Stunningly Moody Work of Tracy Harris on Exhibit at Graham". Houston Post [Houston, Tex] 17 Mar 1990: E4. Abstract: "Susan Chadwick reviews an exhibit of drawings by Tracy Harris on display at the Graham Gallery in Houston."
Johnson, Patricia C. "Galleries display art worth fighting for". Houston Chronicle [Houston, Tex] 06 Apr 1990: 7. Abstract: Review of Gael Stack at Moody, Tracy Harris at Graham and Jim Hatchett at Marvin Seline galleries.
Chadwick, Susan. "Young Artists' Works Offer Thoughtful Twists and Turns", Houston Post [Houston, Tex] 22 June 1991: F1. Abstract: "Susan Chadwick reviews the exhibits "Annette Lawrence: Acts of Peace," at the Barnes-Blackman Galleries and "Tracy Harris: Paintings," at the Graham Gallery in Houston." 
Chadwick, Susan. "Twin shows different in design, close in spirit", Houston Post [Houston, Tex] 15 Apr 1993: D2. Abstract: "Susan Chadwick reviews an exhibit by painter Tracy Harris on display at the McMurtrey Gallery in Houston and an exhibit by sculptor Dan Flavin on display at the Texas Gallery in Houston. "

External links 
 

1958 births
Living people
People from Lawton, Oklahoma
Artists from Dallas
People from East Hampton (town), New York
Artists from Oklahoma
Artists from New York (state)
20th-century American artists
20th-century American women artists
21st-century American artists
21st-century American women artists
Southern Methodist University alumni